Michael Goodner (born 14 March 1953) is a Puerto Rican former swimmer who competed in the 1968 Summer Olympics.

References

1953 births
Living people
Puerto Rican male swimmers
Puerto Rican male freestyle swimmers
Olympic swimmers of Puerto Rico
Swimmers at the 1968 Summer Olympics
Central American and Caribbean Games gold medalists for Puerto Rico
Competitors at the 1970 Central American and Caribbean Games
Central American and Caribbean Games medalists in swimming